Cobb's Tavern is a historic colonial tavern building in Sharon, Massachusetts. It is a -story wood-frame building, with brick end walls, a central chimney, and a pair of chimneys near the left wall.  A single-story porch extends across the building's rightmost five bays.  The original part of the house was built c. 1740, and is known to have served as a tavern for most of the 19th century.  It also housed the East Sharon Post Office between 1817 and 1895.  It is now a private residence.

The building was listed on the National Register of Historic Places in 1974.

See also
National Register of Historic Places listings in Norfolk County, Massachusetts

References

Drinking establishments on the National Register of Historic Places in Massachusetts
Buildings and structures in Norfolk County, Massachusetts
National Register of Historic Places in Norfolk County, Massachusetts
Sharon, Massachusetts